The Central District of Pasargad County is a district (bakhsh) in Pasargad County, Fars Province, Iran. At the 2006 census, its population was 23,654, in 5,640 families.  The District has one city: Saadat Shahr. The District has two rural districts (dehestan): Kamin Rural District and Sarpaniran Rural District.

References 

Pasargad County
Districts of Fars Province